The George S. and Dolores Doré Eccles Foundation is a non-profit foundation located in Salt Lake City, Utah that gives grants for projects and programs throughout Utah in the following areas: arts and culture, community, education, health care, and preservation and conservation.

History
The foundation was founded in 1960 by George S. Eccles and his wife Dolores Doré Eccles. Following the death of George S. in 1982, the Foundation became more active. By 2017, it had awarded more than $600 million to various organizations around the state of Utah.

In 2021, KPCW renamed its studios the Spencer F. Eccles Broadcast Center following a $400,000 grant from the foundation. The project allowed KPCW to expand its broadcast facilities.

Grant recipients

Arts and culture
 Utah Shakespearean Festival

Community
 Boy Scouts of America
 Salvation Army
 United Way of Utah County

Education
 Brigham Young University
 Snow College
 Southern Utah University
 University of Utah
 Natural History Museum of Utah at the University of Utah
 University of Utah College of Engineering
 University of Utah School of Medicine
 Utah State University
 Utah Tech University
 Utah Valley University

Healthcare
 American Red Cross
 Intermountain Health Care
 Moran Eye Center
 University of Utah

Preservation and conservation
 Tracy Aviary in Liberty Park
 Preservation Utah
 Red Butte Garden and Arboretum
 This Is The Place Heritage Park

References

Non-profit organizations based in Utah
1960 establishments in Utah
Eccles family